Massey (also McKendra, McKendree, McKendry) is an unincorporated community in Morgan County,  Alabama, United States.

Notes

Unincorporated communities in Morgan County, Alabama
Unincorporated communities in Alabama